Niina is a Finnish feminine given name, the Finnish version of Nina; it is also used in Japanese to transliterate the name Nina. 

Niina may refer to the following notable people:
Niina Kelo (born 1980), Finnish pentathlete 
Niina Koskela (born 1971), Finnish chessplayer
Niina Ning Zhang, Chinese linguist
Niina Mäkinen (born 1992), Finnish ice hockey forward
Niina Malm (born 1982), Finnish politician 
Niina Petrõkina (born 2004), Estonian figure skater
Niina Sarias (born 1984), Finnish snowboarder

See also
Ayano Niina (born 1988), stage name of the Japanese voice actress 

Finnish feminine given names